Susan Diane Wojcicki (born July 5, 1968) is a Polish-American business executive who was the CEO of YouTube from 2014 to 2023. Her net worth was estimated at $765 million in 2022.

Wojcicki has worked in the technology industry for over twenty years. She became involved in the creation of Google in 1998 when she rented out her garage as an office to the company's founders. She worked as Google's first marketing manager in 1999, and later led the company's online advertising business and original video service. After observing the success of YouTube, she suggested that Google should buy it; the deal was approved for $1.65 billion in 2006. She was appointed CEO of YouTube in 2014. She resigned as CEO in 2023.

Early life
Susan Diane Wojcicki was born in Santa Clara County, California, on July 5, 1968, the daughter of Esther Wojcicki, an American journalist, and Stanley Wojcicki, a Polish physics professor at Stanford University. Her maternal grandparents were Russian Jewish immigrants. Her paternal grandfather, Franciszek Wójcicki, was a Polish politician who had been elected MP during the 1947 Polish legislative election. Her paternal grandmother, Janina Wójcicka Hoskins, was a Polish-American librarian at the Library of Congress and was responsible for building the largest collection of Polish material in the U.S. She has two sisters: Janet, a doctor of anthropology and epidemiology, and Anne, an entrepreneur who is the co-founder and CEO of 23andMe.

Wojcicki grew up on the Stanford campus, where mathematical scientist George Dantzig was her neighbor. She attended Gunn High School in Palo Alto, California, and wrote for the school newspaper. Her first business was selling "spice ropes" door-to-door at the age of eleven. A humanities major in college, she took her first computer science class as a senior. She studied history and literature at Harvard University and graduated with honors in 1990. She originally planned on getting a PhD in economics and pursuing a career in academia, but changed her plans when she discovered an interest in technology. She also received her MS in economics in 1993 from the University of California, Santa Cruz, and an MBA in 1998 from the UCLA Anderson School of Management.

Career

Before Google 
Before becoming Google's first marketing manager in 1999, Wojcicki worked in marketing at Intel Corporation in Santa Clara, California, and was a management consultant at Bain & Company and R.B. Webber & Company.

Google 
In September 1998, the same month that Google was incorporated, its co-founders Larry Page and Sergey Brin set up office in Wojcicki's garage in Menlo Park, California. At Google, she worked on the initial viral marketing programs, helped create the company's longtime logo with designer Ruth Kedar, and spearheaded the first Google Doodles. She also co-developed and launched Google Image Search with engineer Huican Zhu.

In 2003, Wojcicki was the first product manager of one of Google's seminal advertising products—AdSense. She earned the Google Founders' Award in recognition for this work. Wojcicki was subsequently promoted to Google's senior vice president of Advertising & Commerce, and oversaw the company's advertising and analytic products, including AdWords, AdSense, DoubleClick, and Google Analytics.

YouTube, then a small start-up, was successfully competing with Google's Google Video service, overseen by Wojcicki. She recommended and subsequently managed the $1.65 billion purchase of YouTube in 2006, as well as the $3.1 billion purchase of DoubleClick in 2007.

YouTube 
In February 2014, Wojcicki became the CEO of YouTube. She was named "the most important person in advertising," as well as named one of Times 100 most influential people in 2015 and described in a later issue of Time as "the most powerful woman on the Internet." In December 2014, she joined the board of Salesforce. She also serves on the board of Room to Read, an organization that focuses on literacy and gender equality in education, and is a board member of UCLA Anderson School of Management.

After Wojcicki became the CEO of YouTube, the company reached 2 billion logged-in users a month and that users were watching one billion hours a day. By 2021, YouTube had paid more than $30 billion to creators, artists, and media companies. There are localized versions of YouTube in 100 countries around the world across 80 languages. Since she became CEO, YouTube's percentage of female employees has risen from 24 to nearly 30 percent.Wojcicki also emphasized new YouTube applications and experiences designed to cater to users interested in family gaming, and music content. While CEO, the company developed 10 forms of monetization for YouTube creators, including channel memberships, merchandise, BrandConnect, and paid digital goods like Super Chat. She also launched YouTube's advertisement-free subscription service, YouTube Premium (formerly known as YouTube Red), and its over-the-top (OTT) internet television service YouTube TV. In 2020, the company launched YouTube Shorts, its short-form video experience, which recently surpassed 50 billion daily views. In November 2022, YouTube publicized that the company had surpassed 80 million Music and Premium subscribers, including trialers. The company also reported over 100 billion hours of global gaming content watched on the platform in 2020.

Wojcicki tightened YouTube's policy on videos it regards as potentially violating its policies on hate speech and violent extremism. The more stringent policies came after The Times showed that "ads sponsored by the British government and several private sector companies had appeared ahead of YouTube videos supporting terrorist groups" and several large advertisers withdrew their ads from YouTube in response. The enforcement policies have been criticized as censorship. YouTube has also faced criticism that the company applies its enforcement policies inconsistently, with larger content creators treated more favorably. During the controversy surrounding Logan Paul's YouTube video about a person that committed suicide, Wojcicki said that Paul did not violate YouTube's three-strike policy and did not meet the criteria for being banned from the platform.

Wojcicki has emphasized educational content as a priority for the company, and on July 20, 2018, announced the initiative YouTube Learning, which invests in grants and promotion to support education focused creator content.

On October 22, 2018, Wojcicki wrote that Article 13, as written in the European Union Copyright Directive, would make YouTube directly liable for copyrighted content, and poses a threat to content creators' ability to share their work.

On February 16, 2023, Wojcicki announced her resignation from YouTube via a company blog post. She said she wanted to focus on "family, health, and personal projects" but would be taking on an advisory role across Google and its parent company Alphabet.

Advocacy 
Wojcicki has been an advocate for several causes, including the expansion of paid family leave, the plight of Syrian refugees, countering gender discrimination at technology companies, getting young girls interested in computer science, and prioritizing computer programming and coding in schools.

Wojcicki endorsed Hillary Clinton in the 2016 U.S. presidential election.

Personal life
Wojcicki married Google's director of product management Dennis Troper in Belmont, California, on August 23, 1998. They have five children. On December 16, 2014, ahead of taking her fifth maternity leave, she wrote an article in The Wall Street Journal about the importance of paid maternity leave. She is often quoted talking about the importance of finding the balance between family and career. In addition to her American citizenship, Wojcicki holds Polish citizenship through her father.

Awards 
Wojcicki was named #1 on Vanity Fair's New Establishment list in 2019.

 In 2013, she was named #1 on the Adweek Top 50 Execs list, which recognizes the top media executives within an organization.  
In 2017, Wojcicki ranked #6 on Forbes' list of the World's 100 Most Powerful Women.
 In 2018, she ranked #10 on Fortune's list of Most Powerful Women.
 Wojcicki is currently ranked #41 on Forbes' list of America's Self-Made Women.
On April 15, 2021, Wojcicki was presented the “Free Expression Award” by the Freedom Forum Institute, a nonprofit dedicated to advancing First Amendment freedoms. The award ceremony was criticized for being sponsored by her own platform.

References

External links

1968 births
Living people
20th-century American businesspeople
21st-century American businesspeople
American advertising executives
American businesspeople in the online media industry
20th-century American Jews
American management consultants
American marketing businesspeople
American people of Polish descent
American people of Russian-Jewish descent
American technology chief executives
American women chief executives
Bain & Company employees
Businesspeople from California
Google employees
Harvard College alumni
Intel people
Marketing women
People from Palo Alto, California
People from Santa Clara County, California
UCLA Anderson School of Management alumni
University of California, Santa Cruz alumni
YouTube
20th-century American businesswomen
21st-century American businesswomen
Gunn High School alumni
21st-century American Jews
Salesforce